Atonsu may refer: 

 Atonsu (Ashanti Region), Ghana
 Atonsu (Central Region), Ghana

See also
 Atonu